Recycling codes are used to identify the materials out of which the item is made, to facilitate easier recycling process. The presence on an item of a recycling code, a chasing arrows logo, or a resin code, is not an automatic indicator that a material is recyclable; it is an explanation of what the item is made of. Codes have been developed for batteries, biomatter/organic material, glass, metals, paper, and plastics. Various countries have adopted different codes. For example, the table below shows the polymer resin (plastic) codes. In the United States there are fewer, because ABS is placed with "others" in group 7.

A number of countries have a more granular system of recycling codes. For example, China's polymer identification system has seven different classifications of plastic, five different symbols for post-consumer paths, and 140 identification codes. The lack of a code system in some countries has encouraged those who fabricate their own plastic products, such as RepRap and other prosumer 3-D printer users, to adopt a voluntary recycling code based on the more comprehensive Chinese system.

Resin identification codes and codes defined by the European Commission

Chinese codes for plastics products 

The Standardization Administration of the People's Republic of China (SAC) has defined material codes for different types of plastics in the document GB 16288-2008. The numbers are consistent with RIC up to #6.

Alternative recycling labels
The following recycling label projects are designed with the consumer in mind while SPI or Resin Identification Codes are designed to be recognized by waste sorting facilities. They provide an alternative that eliminates confusion as people often mistake any resin code to be recyclable, but this is not necessarily true. The recyclability of the numbers depends on the abilities of the facilities in the community. Thus, they are not all automatically recyclable.

How2Recycle is a project that started in 2008. The label provides information about the packaging material and clearly indicates whether it is recyclable, partially or totally.  If it is not recyclable at all, it is shown by a diagonal line going through the recycling label.

On-Pack Recycling Label used in the UK. It is very simple and only states whether it is recyclable or not.

See also
Resin identification code
Japanese recycling symbols
Waste hierarchy
Waste management
Food safe symbol
Bag It (documentary)

References

External links

 Christie Engineering Standard – Packaging Labeling and Design for Environment Guidelines Includes lists of material codes in several countries.
 Packaging Material Codes  Includes lists of material codes in Germany.

Recycling
Environmental standards
Waste management concepts
Recycling Codes
Recycling Codes
Recycling Codes
Consumer symbols